Stadionul Municipal is a multi-use stadium in Zalău, Romania. It is used mostly for football matches and is the home ground of SCM Zalău. The stadium was renovated between 2017 and 2018, period in which the second stand (a metallic one) was demolished. Currently the ground holds 3,500 people in its main stand (approx. 1,000 on seats, 1,500 on benches and 1,000 on standing terrace).

In the past, Municipal Stadium was the home ground of Armătura Zalău and FC Zalău.

References

External links
Stadionul Municipal (Zalău) at soccerway.com

Football venues in Romania
Buildings and structures in Sălaj County